Kersbach Castle is a levelled medieval motte castle in the area of Pfarrgartenstraße 1 in the village of Kersbach, in the borough of Forchheim in the eponymous county in the south German state of Bavaria.

Nothing of the old motte castle has survived above ground.

See also 
 List of German motte and bailey castles

References

Castles in Bavaria
Forchheim
Motte-and-bailey castles